Banele Mhango (also known as Banelevich), is a South African chess player and coach who was awarded the FIDE title of FIDE Master in 2020 (and Candidate Master in 2018). He was named sportsman of the year after representing the country in competitions in Kenya and Egypt.

In 2017 he won the under 16 open category at The South African Junior Closed Championship, and in 2018 Mhango competed in Kenya where he placed third, won Bronze medal and earned the Candidate Master title, subsequent to his success and victory he went on to compete in Egypt where he was awarded the FiDE Master title and earned his spot to compete in Greece, however due to financial difficulties he was wasn't able to make it. In 2022 he competed in the World Team Chess Championship where he was partnered with the likes of Grandmaster Kenny Solomon and International Master Daniel Cawdery going against Grandmasters Anish Giri, Maxime Vachier-Lagrave, Nihal Sarin and Hans Niemann just to mention a few.

See also 
 Chess in South Africa

References

External links 
 
 
 
 

2003 births
Living people
South African chess players
People from Mpumalanga